Ron Dickerson (born July 2, 1948) is a former American football player and coach.  He served as the head football coach at the Temple University from 1993 until 1997, at Alabama State University from 1998 through 1999, and at Lambuth University in 2010, compiling a career college football coaching record of 19–68.

Coaching career
On January 8, 2010, Dickerson was named head football coach at Lambuth University replacing Hugh Freeze, who accepted a job with Arkansas State University. Lambuth University shut down after the 2010 season.

On July 14, 2011, Dickerson was named defensive line coach at Gardner–Webb University, joining his son Ron Dickerson, Jr.'s coaching staff.

Head coaching record

References

1948 births
Living people
American football defensive backs
Alabama State Hornets football coaches
Clemson Tigers football coaches
Colorado Buffaloes football coaches
Kansas State Wildcats football coaches
Kansas State Wildcats football players
Lambuth Eagles football coaches
Louisville Cardinals football coaches
Penn State Nittany Lions football coaches
Pittsburgh Panthers football coaches
Temple Owls football coaches
People from Coraopolis, Pennsylvania
African-American coaches of American football
African-American players of American football
20th-century African-American sportspeople
21st-century African-American sportspeople